is a former Japanese football player and manager. He played for the Japan national team.

Club career
Kamata was born in Ibaraki Prefecture on December 16, 1937. After graduating from Chuo University, he joined Furukawa Electric in 1960. He won the 1960, 1961, and 1964 Emperor's Cup. In 1965, Furukawa Electric joined the new Japan Soccer League. He retired in 1974. He played 106 games and scored 6 goals in the league. He was selected for the Best Eleven in 1967, 1968, and 1969.

National team career
On December 25, 1958, when Kamata was a Chuo University student, he debuted for the Japan national team against Hong Kong. He played at the 1964 Summer Olympics in Tokyo and the 1968 Summer Olympics in Mexico City. He played in all matches at both tournaments and Japan won the bronze medal in 1968. In 2018, this team was selected for the Japan Football Hall of Fame. He also played at the 1962 Asian Games. He played 44 games and scored 2 goals for Japan until 1958.

Coaching career
After retirement, Kamata became a manager for Furukawa Electric as Saburo Kawabuchi's successor in 1976 and managed until 1978. The club won the championship of the 1976 Japan Soccer League, 1976 Emperor's Cup, and 1977 JSL Cup. In 1981, he signed with the Japanese Regional Leagues club Daikyo Oil (later Cosmo Oil). He led the club to win league championship four times and promoted the club to the Japan Soccer League Division 2 in 1986. He resigned in 1991. In 2007, he was selected for the Japan Football Hall of Fame.

Club statistics

National team statistics

National team goals

Awards
 Japan Soccer League Best Eleven: (3) 1967, 1968, 1969

References

External links

 
 Japan National Football Team Database
Japan Football Hall of Fame at Japan Football Association
Japan Football Hall of Fame (Japan team at 1968 Olympics) at Japan Football Association

1937 births
Living people
Chuo University alumni
Association football people from Ibaraki Prefecture
Japanese footballers
Japan international footballers
Japan Soccer League players
JEF United Chiba players
Japanese football managers
Olympic medalists in football
Olympic footballers of Japan
Olympic bronze medalists for Japan
Medalists at the 1968 Summer Olympics
Footballers at the 1964 Summer Olympics
Footballers at the 1968 Summer Olympics
Footballers at the 1962 Asian Games
Association football defenders
Asian Games competitors for Japan